Drosophila lanaiensis was a species of fly in family Drosophilidae that was endemic to Hawaii. It lived on Lānaʻi, and possibly on Oʻahu.

References 

l
Endemic fauna of Hawaii
Extinct Hawaiian animals
Insects described in 1901
Taxonomy articles created by Polbot